The Clerk of the Parliaments is the chief clerk of the House of Lords in the Parliament of the United Kingdom. The position has existed since at least 1315, and duties include preparing the minutes of Lords proceedings, advising on proper parliamentary procedure and pronouncing the Royal Assent. Many of the Clerk's duties are now fulfilled by his deputies and the Clerk of the Parliaments' Office.

The Under Clerk of the Parliaments is the formal name for the Clerk of the House of Commons.

The term Clerk of the Parliaments is also used as a formal alternative title by the Clerk of the Senate of Canada and the Clerks of the Legislative Councils of New South Wales and Western Australia. In the Australian state of Victoria the title is given to the longer-serving of the Clerks of the Legislative Council and Legislative Assembly. The title was also formerly used for the Clerk of the Australian Senate and the longer-serving of the Clerks of the Legislative Council and Legislative Assembly of South Australia.

History
The position has existed since at least 1315, when records from the parliament held by Edward II at Lincoln make reference to a clerk nominated by the king to serve as a "special deputy". This clerk was tasked with reading out the titles of bills and the responses from Parliament. In later parliaments starting with those under Richard II, the Clerk of the Crown in Chancery would read the titles, and the Clerk of the Parliaments the responses. The actual term Clerk of the Parliaments did not come into use until the reign of Henry VIII, and the plural (parliaments, rather than Parliament) signifies that it is a life appointment – the clerk is appointed for all parliaments, not just the one currently sitting. On 12 March 1660 a deputy clerk was appointed for the first time after the clerk (Mr Bowyer) was too ill to attend Parliament. The Clerk of the Parliaments Act 1824 defined the clerk's duties for the first time in statute, and the act is still in force and binding on current clerks.

Appointment and duties
The Clerk of the Parliaments is appointed by letters patent from the sovereign, who also holds the sole power to remove him or her. The Clerk has a variety of tasks within the House of Lords. Appointees were originally ecclesiastical figures, although the nineteenth century saw a shift towards members of the legal profession. He is assisted by two other clerks – the Clerk Assistant and the Reading Clerk.

The Clerk of the Parliaments, or another clerk, sits in the chamber at the table of the house during sittings, and calls on items of business. At the start of a sitting all three table clerks (Clerk of the Parliaments, Clerk Assistant and Reading Clerk) are normally present. When at the table the Clerk wears court dress (including a tail coat and waistcoat), a gown and a wig. The wig worn by the Clerk of the Parliaments is a bench wig as worn by a High Court judge; other clerks wear a barrister's wig. Male clerks wear a wing collar and white bow tie, and female clerks bands as worn by barristers.

As well as providing advice on procedure, the clerk also prepares the minutes of proceedings in the Lords, signs all official documents and communications, returns bills to the House of Commons and pronounces the Royal Assent. The clerk also supervises several offices, including his own (the Clerk of the Parliaments' Office), Black Rod's Department, which deals with security in the Lords, the Committee Office, which gives legal and procedural advice to committees within the Lords, and formerly (until 2009) the Judicial Office, which advised and assisted the Law Lords. Since the nineteenth century many of these duties have been performed by his deputies and his own office.

Office holders

References

External links
The records of the Clerk of the Parliaments are held by the UK Parliamentary Archives

Bibliography

House of Lords
Legislative clerks